Braggs can refer to:
 Glenn Braggs (born 1962), American former Major League Baseball player
 Torraye Braggs (born 1976), American basketball player
 Braggs, Oklahoma, United States, a town
 Braggs, a former chain of bakers based in the English Midlands which were merged into Greggs in 1999